Franclemontia is a genus of moths of the family Noctuidae.

Species
 Franclemontia interrogans (Walker, 1856)

References
Natural History Museum Lepidoptera genus database
Franclemontia at funet

Xyleninae